Wang Zhiyu (born August 24, 1996, in Harbin) is a Chinese curler.

Career
As a junior curler, Wang threw last rocks for the Chinese junior men's team at the 2017 and 2018 World Junior Curling Championships, skipping the team in 2018. In 2017, Wang, skip Yuan Ming Jie, and front end Li Hong Bo and Kang Xin Long finished with a 2–7 record. In 2018, Wang led his team of Tian Jiafeng, Wang Xiangkun, and Zhang Zezhong to a 3–6 record. The team missed the playoffs in both tournaments. 

After juniors, Wang joined the Chinese men's national team in 2018, playing third on the team, which was skipped by Zou Qiang. The team first played in the 2018 Pacific-Asia Curling Championships, where they won a silver medal. The team qualified for the 2019 World Men's Curling Championship, finishing with a 2–10 record. Also that season, Wang played in the final leg of the Curling World Cup as second for Ba Dexin. The team lost in the event's final to Canada's Kevin Koe.

Team Zou represented China at the 2019 Pacific-Asia Curling Championships. There, the team finished with a 7–2 round robin record. Following the round robin, the team lost in the semifinal to Japan but won the bronze medal game against New Zealand. The team then had to play in the 2020 World Qualification Event to qualify for the World Championship, which they won. This secured China a spot at the cancelled 2020 World Men's Curling Championship. On the World Curling Tour that season, Team Zou won the 2019 Black Diamond / High River Cash event.

Because of the COVID-19 pandemic, most of the 2020–21 curling season was cancelled. However, the 2021 World Men's Curling Championship took place in a fan-less bubble in Calgary, with the teams qualifying for the 2020 Worlds qualifying for the event. At the 2021 Worlds, the team finished in last place with a 2–11 record.

The next season, Wang was selected to be the second on the Chinese men's team for the 2022 Winter Olympics, held in Beijing. The team also included skip Ma Xiuyue, Zou Qiang, Xu Jingtao and Jiang Dongxu. Despite not playing a single international competition before the Games, the team fared quite well, finishing the round robin with a 4–5 record. This included defeating higher-seeded teams such as Switzerland's Peter de Cruz, Norway's Steffen Walstad, and Italy's Joël Retornaz. Ultimately, they finished in a four-way tie for fifth place; however, their head to head wins over Switzerland and Norway placed them alone in fifth place at the end of the competition.

References

External links

Living people
1996 births
Chinese male curlers
Sportspeople from Harbin
Curlers at the 2022 Winter Olympics
Olympic curlers of China